Khel Mohabbat Ka is a 1986 Indian Bollywood drama film directed by Satish Duggal and produced by Digvijay. It stars Farooq Shaikh, Shakti Kapoor and Poonam Dhillon in pivotal roles.

Cast
 Farooq Shaikh as Amit Verma
 Poonam Dhillon as Lily / Shyamoli
 Shakti Kapoor as Ranjeet
 Madan Puri as Rehman Khan
 Prema Narayan as Ranjeet's Secretary
 Ramesh Deo as Seth Lala, Lily's Father
 Seema Deo as Shyama, Lily's Mother
 Birbal as Saxena

References

External links

1980s Hindi-language films
1986 films
Indian drama films